Tell City is a city in Troy Township, Perry County, in the U.S. state of Indiana. It is along the Ohio River. The population was 7,272 at the 2010 census. The city is the county seat of Perry County.

History
Tell City traces its 150+ year old roots to a meeting in Cincinnati, Ohio in November 1856. A group of Swiss-German immigrants met in Cincinnati to organize a society known as the "Swiss Colonization Society." The society's purpose was to obtain affordable homesteads for mechanics, shopkeepers, factory workers, and small farmers in a location where all could live in harmony.

The Society decided to purchase a tract of land three miles (5 km) square to be surveyed as a city plot. The group was sent out to purchase the land and told to keep in mind they should find a healthful climate, fertile soil, good water, ample timber, as well as a location near a navigable river and a railroad, if possible. Purchase of a  suitable site was made in July 1857. The tract, containing , was laid out in 392 town blocks with 7,328 building lots and 294 garden lots.

Before the settlers arrived, a name for the new town was selected. Initially called Helvetia, it was soon renamed Tell City, a name easier to pronounce and remember for English-speaking people. It was named for the legendary Swiss hero and liberator, William Tell.

Indicative of the foresightedness of Tell City's founders are the wide streets. They are named for great persons of the military, arts, letters and science: DeKalb, Watt, Winkelreid, Steuben, Payne, Herrman, Reubens, Lafayette, Schiller, Tell, Fulton, Jefferson, Mozart, Franklin, Humboldt, Pestalozzi, Washington, Blum and Gutenberg.

The Tell City post office has been in operation since 1858.

With 100 years of recorded history, the citizens of Tell City held a centennial celebration August 10–17, 1958 in honor of the early settlers and the founding of Tell City. After the success of the Centennial, the Tell City Historical Society decided they would sponsor a festival in 1959 to determine if the community would support it as an annual event. The festival, named Schweizer Fest (Swiss Fest), was a great success. Today, the festival remains one of Indiana's longest-running community festivals.

On March 17, 1960, Northwest Orient Airlines Flight 710, a Lockheed Electra turboprop airliner flying from Chicago to Miami lost a wing due to aerodynamic flutter and crashed in southern Indiana near Tell City. All 63 on board, including the crew, perished. The victims were impacted in a  crater, which became their final resting place. A monument with the names of the victims and the date of the tragedy marks the grave.

Steamboat 'Tell City'

The steamboat 'TELL CITY' was built in 1889 and named after Tell City. It was used to carry passengers and freight on the Ohio River until it sank on April 6, 1917 in Little Hocking, Ohio. The pilothouse survived the sinking and is the oldest remaining steamboat pilothouse, located at the Ohio River Museum in Marietta, Ohio.

Education
Tell City is home to the Tell City High School Marksmen. The school is in Class 2A for football, basketball, and baseball.

Tell City has a public library, a branch of the Perry County Public Library.

Geography

Demographics

2010 census
As of the census of 2010, there were 7,272 people, 3,224 households, and 1,971 families residing in the city. The racial makeup of the city was 97.5% White, 0.3% African American, 0.3% Native American, 0.7% Asian, 0.3% from other races, and 0.9% from two or more races. Hispanic or Latino of any race were 1.0% of the population.

There were 3,224 households, of which 28.4% had children under the age of 18 living with them, 44.9% were married couples living together, 11.4% had a female householder with no husband present, 4.8% had a male householder with no wife present, and 38.9% were non-families. 34.3% of all households were made up of individuals, and 16.5% had someone living alone who was 65 years of age or older. The average household size was 2.23 and the average family size was 2.84.

The median age in the city was 42 years. 22% of residents were under the age of 18; 7.6% were between the ages of 18 and 24; 24.1% were from 25 to 44; 27% were from 45 to 64; and 19.3% were 65 years of age or older. The gender makeup of the city was 47.5% male and 52.5% female.

2000 census
As of the census of 2000, there were 7,845 people, 3,404 households, and 2,161 families residing in the city. The racial makeup of the city was 98.65% White, 0.27% African American, 0.18% Native American, 0.23% Asian, 0.04% Pacific Islander, 0.14% from other races, and 0.50% from two or more races. Hispanic or Latino of any race were 0.89% of the population.

There were 3,404 households, out of which 26.4% had children under the age of 18 living with them, 49.3% were married couples living together, 10.7% had a female householder with no husband present, and 36.5% were non-families. 33.3% of all households were made up of individuals, and 17.2% had someone living alone who was 65 years of age or older. The average household size was 2.25 and the average family size was 2.85.

In the city, the population was spread out, with 21.9% under the age of 18, 9.2% from 18 to 24, 25.4% from 25 to 44, 22.7% from 45 to 64, and 20.8% who were 65 years of age or older. The median age was 41 years. For every 100 females, there were 89.5 males. For every 100 females age 18 and over, there were 84.6 males.

The median income for a household in the city was $31,045, and the median income for a family was $41,300. Males had a median income of $31,908 versus $21,232 for females. The per capita income for the city was $17,443. About 8.0% of families and 11.2% of the population were below the poverty line, including 15.7% of those under age 18 and 8.8% of those age 65 or over.

Notable people
There have been several notable residents and former residents of Tell City.
Krista Blunk - former college basketball star
Wally Bruner - American journalist and television host
Ray Eddy - former college basketball coach of the Purdue Boilermakers
Paul D. Etienne - Sixth Archbishop of Seattle
Tom Kron - former college (Univ of Kentucky) and professional basketball star for the St. Louis Hawks, Seattle SuperSonics and Kentucky Colonels
Bob Lochmueller - former NBA player, college & high school basketball coach
Edwin D. Patrick - commander of the 6th Infantry Division during World War II
Bob Polk - former college basketball coach; head coach for Vanderbilt, St Louis and Rice Owls men's basketball
Burke Scott - former college basketball player, high school basketball coach and U.S. Army Officer

See also
 List of cities and towns along the Ohio River

References

External links

 City website
 Perry County News, local newspaper
 Perry County Chamber of Commerce, local Chamber of Commerce

Cities in Indiana
Populated places established in 1858
Communities of Southwestern Indiana
Cities in Perry County, Indiana
County seats in Indiana
Swiss-American culture in Indiana
Indiana populated places on the Ohio River
1858 establishments in Indiana
William Tell
Sundown towns in Indiana